Parta is a village in Serbia. It is situated in the Vršac municipality, in the South Banat District. The village has a Serb ethnic majority (95.49%) and its population numbers 376 people (2011 census).

References

Populated places in Serbian Banat
Populated places in South Banat District
Vršac